The Second Railway Package is a group of European Union legislation which promote common standards and open access, working towards an integrated European railway area.

History
For much of the 20th century, rail transport in Europe was dominated by national monopolies; these effectively excluded competitors from their networks. Starting in 1991, the EU developed legislation to open railways up to competition, which would help them regain modal share from road and air transport.

Legislation

Directive 2004/49/EC
2004/49/EC is the Railway Safety Directive; it has since been amended by Directive 2008/110/EC. It harmonised safety principles, including procedures for granting safety approval to railway operators and infrastructure owners.

Directive 2004/50/EC
Directive 2004/50/EC harmonised interoperability requirements, particularly for high-speed rail. It amended Directives 96/48 and 2001/16; it has since been updated by 2008/57/EC.

Directive 2004/51/EC
Directive 2004/51/EC allowed open access for freight services, nationally and internationally, starting in January 2007

Regulation (EC) 881/2004
Regulation 881/2004 created the European Railway Agency, to coordinate safety and interoperability efforts.

See also
EU Directive 91/440: The First Railway Package
ERTMS - A pan-European signalling system being promoted by the EU.
European Railway Agency
Rail transport in Europe
Third railway package
Fourth railway package

References

External links
European Commission webpage on the second railway package
European Railway Agency

Transport and the European Union
Rail transport in Europe
European Union laws
2004 in law
2004 in rail transport
International rail transport
Railway02